Thanking the Audience was a 1900 French short silent film directed by Georges Méliès. It was released by Méliès's Star Film Company and is numbered 292 in its catalogues.

The film was designed to be projected at the end of a showing of short films. It depicted seven international figures—"a Frenchman, English soldier, German, Spaniard, Italian lady, Russian, and Turkish lady"—transforming into each other, each displaying the words "Thanks, hope to see you again" in a different language.

Thanking the Audience is currently presumed lost.

References

1900 films
French silent short films
Films directed by Georges Méliès
Lost French films
French black-and-white films
1900s French films